Arcutelphusa is a genus of moths in the family Gelechiidae. It contains only one species, Arcutelphusa talladega, which is found in North America, where it has been recorded from Alabama, North Carolina and Mississippi.

The wingspan is 8.5–10 mm. The forewings are light brown with a dark brown subbasal fascia. The median and postmedian fasciae are dark brown, confluent or partly separated by light brown scales. There are scattered dark brown scales in the apical fourth of the wing. The hindwings are brownish grey.

Etymology
The genus name is derived from a combination of the Latin noun arcus (meaning bend), referring to the bending of the valval costa, and Telphusa, a basal genus of Teleiodini. The species name refers to Talladega National Forest, the type locality.

References

Litini
Monotypic moth genera
Moths described in 2008
Moths of North America